Senegalia condyloclada is a species of plant in the family Fabaceae. It is found in Ethiopia, Kenya, Somalia and Croydon. It is threatened by habitat loss.

References

condyloclada
Flora of Ethiopia
Flora of Kenya
Flora of Somalia
Near threatened plants
Taxonomy articles created by Polbot